Spring Gardens is an important thoroughfare in Manchester city centre. This L-shaped street, formerly the centre of the north-west banking industry, has five Grade II listed buildings and is part of the Upper King Street conservation area.

Location
King Street runs from Market Street to the north to the eastern end of King Street, then turns left (south-east) crossing Mosley Street, continuing as Charlotte Street.

Notable buildings
Five buildings are listed Grade II.

Even nos. (west side)
 Tootal House, John Radcliffe and Associates 1982 
 Lowry House, with a 58-metre tower, Arthur Smith and Associates 1975-76 
Nos.60 and 62. A former warehouse, built in 1881-1883 by Alfred Waterhouse,  then occupied by Minster Insurance. Grade II. 

Odd nos. (east side)
 The Post Office,  Cruikshank & Seward (1969). There has been a Post Office in Spring Gardens since 1623, this building was the largest post office in the north of England when built. The upper interior wall are lined with bold fibreglass panels, in the style of William Mitchell however the designer remains mysteriously anonymous.
 Amethyst House by Howitt and Tucker. 1973 
 1 York St, Former Parr's Bank. Grade II*. 1902 by Charles Heathcote.
 No.41 Waterhouse's 1888-1890 building for the National Provincial Bank. Grade II.  
 Nos.43 and 45. Lancashire & Yorkshire Bank, 1890 by Heathcote & Rawle.
 No.47. The commercial Union Assurance Society building, built by Charles Heathcote in 1881. Former Barclay's Bank. Grade II. 
 No.49. Formerly a warehouse designed by Clegg & Knowles in 1879. Grade II.

See also
List of streets in Manchester

References
Notes

Bibliography

External links
 
Listed buildings in Manchester by street (S)
Downloadable map of the Conservation area

Streets in Manchester
Shopping streets in Manchester
Tourist attractions in Manchester